The Violin sonata in E major (HWV 373) is a work for violin and basso continuo that was originally thought to have been composed by George Frideric Handel. Modern scholars however believe it doubtful that the work was composed by Handel, and have labelled it as "spurious". The work was first published in 1730 by Walsh. Other catalogues of Handel's music have referred to the work as HG ; and HHA .

The sonata was first published in the 1730 Walsh edition as Sonata XII. For some reason Walsh did not republish the work in his 1732 edition. The Chrysander edition published the work as Sonata XV, and the designation of "Opus 1, No. 15" is his. All editions indicate that the work is for violin.

Movements
The work consists of four movements:

(Movements do not contain repeat markings unless indicated. The number of bars is taken from the Chrysander edition, and is the raw number in the manuscript—not including repeat markings.)

See also
List of solo sonatas by George Frideric Handel
XV Handel solo sonatas (publication by Chrysander)
Handel solo sonatas (publication by Walsh)

References

Violin sonatas by George Frideric Handel